Frank Rowley FICE (4 May 1940 – 17 March 2003) was a Scottish civil engineer.

Early life
He was born in West Hartlepool in the north of England.

He attended Paisley Grammar School, then a state selective school.

Career
He left school in 1958 and worked as an apprentice civil engineer with Renfrew County Council, whilst attending night school. On completion of his apprenticeship in 1963 he joined the Livingston Development Corporation, becoming a senior civil engineer.

Motorway bridges
In the early 1970s he worked on the motorway construction programme in South East England, being senior bridge engineer on the M3 where he worked on over 60 bridges as far west as junction 8. He had moved to Surrey.

 He designed the M180 motorway balanced cantilever bridge over the River Trent in Humberside (now North Lincolnshire).
 He led the design team for the Gade Valley Viaduct of the M25, north of junction 20 of the M25 over the River Gade and West Coast Main Line, west of Abbots Langley.
 The 20-span Dornoch Firth Bridge carrying the A9 over the Dornoch Firth. The Dornoch Firth Bridge won a Saltire Award.
 He later designed the Ceiriog Viaduct carrying the A5 over the River Ceiriog.
 From 1994-96 he worked on the Marsh Mills Viaduct of the A38 in Plympton.

In 1980 he became a Fellow of the Institution of Civil Engineers. He was also a Fellow of the Chartered Institute of Arbitrators.

Personal life
He married and had a son. He joined the Edinburgh Wanderers RFC rugby team, later refereeing matches into his fifties. He lived in Cranleigh in the Borough of Waverley. He died in Guildford in west Surrey.

References

 Times Obituary, 27 March 2003

External links
 Scotsman Obituary March 2003

1940 births
2003 deaths
People educated at Paisley Grammar School
People from Cranleigh
People from West Hartlepool
Scottish civil engineers
Viaduct engineers